Roland Händle (born 11 October 1967) is a German former rower. He competed in the men's lightweight coxless four event at the 2000 Summer Olympics.

References

External links
 

1967 births
Living people
German male rowers
Olympic rowers of Germany
Rowers at the 2000 Summer Olympics
Sportspeople from Marburg